Ralf Ehrenbrink (born 29 August 1960 in Bielefeld, Nordrhein-Westfalen) is a German equestrian and Olympic champion. He won a team gold medal in eventing at the 1988 Summer Olympics in Seoul.

References

1960 births
Living people
Sportspeople from Bielefeld
Olympic equestrians of West Germany
German male equestrians
Equestrians at the 1988 Summer Olympics
Equestrians at the 1992 Summer Olympics
Equestrians at the 1996 Summer Olympics
Olympic gold medalists for West Germany
German event riders
Olympic medalists in equestrian
Medalists at the 1988 Summer Olympics
Olympic bronze medalists for Germany